Pierre-Hugues Herbert and Nicolas Mahut were the defending champions, but withdrew before their second round match due to Herbert's leg injury.

Łukasz Kubot and Marcelo Melo won the title, defeating Nicholas Monroe and Jack Sock in the final, 7–5, 6–3.

Henri Kontinen became the no. 1 ranked doubles player after this tournament, following Herbert and Mahut's withdrawal and Bob and Mike Bryan's loss in the semifinals.

Seeds

Draw

Finals

Top half

Bottom half

References
 Main Draw

Doubles